Agnieszka Balewska is a Polish painter born in 1967, who lives in Poznań.

Career 

She graduated from the Academy of Fine Arts in Poznań in 1993. In 2002 she received a PhD degree from the Adam Mickiewicz University. Her PhD thesis Metonimia i metafora wobec artystycznego  fenomenu sztuki obiektu was published in Paris in 2005.

Her artistic activity is focused on painting, performance art, drawing, graphic design, and since 1992 also on art criticism. In 2000-2006 she was one of the editors of the journal Arteon published in Poznań. She wrote several books, and numerous articles in periodicals published in Poland and abroad. She also lectured at the Adam Mickiewicz University and Academy of Fine Arts in Poznań.

She has exhibited in Poland and internationally since 1993, e.g. in Poznań, Warsaw, Łódź, Kraków, Szczecin, Gdańsk, Frankfurt (Oder), Bonn, Hannover, London, Nottingham, Tokyo.

Since 1994 she has her own Verbal Gallery "DUCK-TAK" in Poznań and edits its annual archives. She also initiated the Creative Association "DUCK-ATTACK"

Selected solo exhibits 

1993 - International Art Centre, Poznań, Poland;
1994 - ABC Gallery, Poznań, Poland;
1994 - Teraz Gallery, Szczecin, Poland;
1995 - Pod Lipami Gallery, Poznań, Poland;
1995 - B Gallery, Frankfurt (Oder), Germany;
1996 - Teraz Gallery, Szczecin, Poland;
1996 - ON Gallery, Poznań, Poland;
1997 - performance - Puszczykowo, Poland;
1997 - ABC Gallery, Poznań, Poland;
1998 - Pod Lipami Gallery, Poznań, Poland;
1998 - performance - QQ Gallery, Kraków, Poland;
1999 - Gallery of PKO BP, Poznań, Poland;
2000 - BWA Gallery, Słupsk + Ustka, Poland;
2000 - Pod Lipami Gallery, Poznań, Poland;
2001 - performance, C.K.Zamek, Poznań, Poland;
2001 - Inny Śląsk Gallery, Tarnowskie Góry, Poland;
2001 - University of Tokyo, Japan;
2002 - ABC Gallery, Poznań, Poland;
2002 - Makuhari, Tokyo, Japan;
2003 - Polony Gallery, Poznań, Poland;
2004 - PBG Gallery, Poznań, Poland;
2004 - ZPAP Gallery, Poznań, Poland;
2005 - performance Pod Lipami Gallery, Poznań, Poland;
2006 - Naprzeciw Gallery, Poznań, Poland;
2008 - Arsenał Gallery, Poznań, Poland

References

External links 
 Dossier (in Polish)
 Archives of Verbal Gallery (in Polish)

Artists from Poznań
Living people
1967 births